Encastellation (sometimes castellation, which can also mean crenellation) is the process whereby the feudal kingdoms of Europe became dotted with castles, from which local lords could dominate the countryside of their fiefs and their neighbours', and from which kings could command even the far-off corners of their realms. The ubiquity of the castle is iconic of the Middle Ages. 

The process was rather quick once the castle, as a distinct type of fortress, was introduced. However, it took different forms in different lands. The methods and reasons of encastellation differed based on law (who could legally build a castle), necessity (who needed a castle), and geography (where could castles be effectively built). The stone castle originated probably in the north of France in the tenth century. Older wooden castles, of the motte-and-bailey variety are probably older, though they were far more common until well into the twelfth century.

France
In France, encastellation began in the north, in Normandy and Anjou, under the direction both of local barons as well as the Duke of Normandy and the Count of Anjou. Most of these castles were of the motte-and-bailey type, which could be constructed with ease in a few months. Stone castles, however, were built before the end of the tenth century in Anjou. These were originally nothing more than towers, donjons (from whence dungeon) or keeps. The reason for this proliferation was to provide oneself with protection in times of war, primarily as a place of refuge, but also as a strategic headquarters: a place from which to sally forth to raid and plunder before retreating to safety (again, the castle). For example, in Normandy:

From Normandy and Anjou, encastellation spread to the Loire Valley. In Poitou, there were thirty nine castles by the eleventh century, the constructions primarily of local magnates. Fortification had briskly increased in Gaul during the Viking Age (see Edict of Pistres) and this merely continued apace while the Carolingian dynasty declined in importance and regional control devolved to regional lords. 

In Languedoc and the south of France, there were more serious attempts, the Peace and Truce of God movements, to curb feudal warfare. But with the spread of heresy came the spread of castles as fortresses to which heretic barons could flee, such as the "five sons of Carcassonne."

Italy
In Italy, the process of encastellation is known as incastellamento. It has a specific notion, as the incastellamento describes less the building of castles than the change towards fortified settlements, in which the castle proper (rocca) is a separate part. The term 'incastellamento' for this process was coined by Pierre Toubert. As in France, it was a different process in the north and the south. 

In the north, the castles were originally the seats of the barons. They spread quickly after the disruption of royal authority in Italy in the mid-tenth century. By the eleventh century, the territorial magnates, like the margrave of Tuscany, were supreme and castles dotted the landscape. With the rise of the city-states after the collapse of Tuscan power in the early twelfth century, the powerful merchant families began to construct fortress and towers as residences in the cities. Well-preserved San Gimignano was the result of the struggle between Guelphs and Ghibellines. 

In the centre of the peninsula, the Papal States, the agents of encastellation were not large territorial magnates, but the petty nobles who belonged to various families and factions usually associated with Rome in some way. The Crescentii and the Tusculani constructed fortresses throughout Latium to dominate the roads leading to the Eternal City and the Vatican. During the papal nadir of the tenth and eleventh centuries, their hilltop fortresses gave these minor lords far more power than their territories would otherwise permit. In Rome itself, encastellation often led to the fortifying of the ancient monuments which had fallen into disuses, such as the Arch of Constantine and the Colosseum. These fortresses were usually in the hands of one of the powerful lay families, but sometimes of the popes. 

In the Mezzogiorno, the independent principalities of the Lombards and the Italian city-states, which distanced themselves from any central authority, formed an opportune place for the proliferation of castles. Indeed, the nominally Byzantine duchies of Gaeta, Naples, and Amalfi grew around what were originally small coastal fortresses. The decline of ducal authority in these places has been blamed on the tendency to give outlying regions to younger sons (e.g. Docibilis II of Gaeta granting Fondi to Marinus), who then built their own fortresses and thus became independent in fact. Historian G. A. Loud considers incastellamento as one of the chief reasons for the decline in princely influence in Benevento and Capua (especially the former) during the late tenth century. Historian Barbara Kreutz notes the encastellation of the monastic estates which dominated south Italian politics and contributed to the constant confiscation and invasion of monastic estates as lay barons sought to increase their power against their foes during the war-filled eleventh and twelfth centuries. The arrival of the Normans, adept castle-builders, in the early eleventh century only exacerbated the tendency toward fortification of every hilltop. Together with the Prince of Salerno, they subdued Calabria and encastellated its mountainous territory, leading to the inevitable invasion of Sicily.

Spain

The encastellation of Spain is inextricably linked to the Reconquista. That said, encastellation occurred mostly in the centre of the peninsula. This region, originally a county of the Kingdom of León, even adopted the name Castile because of its many castles. The castles first began to spread quickly in the tenth century, in light of the increasing power of the Castilian counts vis-à-vis the king. During the long reign of Count Fernán González, Castile became de facto independent and its castles multiplied.

Britain

True medieval castles were a somewhat later arrival in Britain than in continental Europe. The process of encastellation in Britain is as inextricably linked to Normanisation (which is, of course, linked to the Norman Conquest) as the encastellation of Spain is to the Reconquista.

England

Normanisation began in England before the Conquest primarily through the Norman sojourn of Ethelred II and the influence of his Norman queen Emma. During the reign of Edward the Confessor (1042–1066), definite strides were taken in spreading Norman ideas to England. Castles were first built in England in his reign under the direction especially of his Norman marcher lord Ralph the Timid. 

Encastellation began in earnest under William the Conqueror in the years immediately following the Battle of Hastings. Castles of the motte-and-bailey were erected quickly all over the country to subdue the locals and prevent foreign invasions by rival claimants to the throne. Within a matter of years, England was fully castled. Most of these castles belonged to the king or one of his tenants-in-chief. The construction of numerous castles by minor lords was a feature, as in most places, of the reign of weaker kings. After the iron hand of William's sons had passed, Stephen took the throne and the Anarchy (1135–1152) of civil war which characterised his reign saw the proliferation of adulterine (unauthorised) castles: to the number of 1,115, according to one chronicler.

Wales

The Welsh Marches had been encastellated from an early date, beginning even before the Conquest. However, the proliferation of castles in Wales dates only from its English conquest, though a few stone castles date from the reign of Llywelyn the Great. 

Motte-and-bailey castles existed from before the thirteenth century in those parts of Wales which fell under English authority and they spread in south Wales after its conquest, but the most famous encastellation of Wales occurred in the north under Edward I of England (1272–1307). His famous Edwardian concentric castles, large stoneworks with multiple rings of defences, grew up at strategic locations throughout the north and the local populace was placed securely under English authority. In this case, encastellation was the result, not of weak central authority, but of a strong royal hand and direction.

Scotland

In Scotland, the spread of castles came with the Normans who, in the twelfth century, began constructing castles of the motte-and-bailey type in the south, where they received royal support, especially in Galloway. At about the same time, the first stone castles appeared in the north, in Orkney, built not by Normans but by the Norse.

Ireland

In Ireland, as in Britain and most of Europe, encastellation was primarily a Norman venture. The first castles were motte-and-baileys built on the expanding frontier of the English Pale and within it to control the local population, according to Gerald of Wales. Stone castles were slow to develop, appearing in the late thirteenth century.

Germany

As in France, so in Germany: the impetus for encastellation was provided, not by a strong monarch, but by the weakening of royal authority. During the eleventh-century Investiture Controversy in Germany and the resulting decline of the royal power, castle-building exploded as local warlords staked claims to formerly royal prerogatives in their petty states. 

In Prussia, during the Drang nach Osten and the Northern Crusades of the twelfth and thirteenth centuries, encastellation was the result of the Margraves of Brandenburg and the Teutonic Knights, who, among others, conquered the land from the pagan Prussians. The construction of castles to control territories occurred at a late point in the development of the castle and these fortresses were large and complex. They were called Ordensburgen and they served as headquarters and training grounds for initiates into the knightly orders.

Notes

Sources
 Gravett, Christopher, and Nicolle, David. The Normans: Warrior Knights and their Castles. Osprey Publishing: Oxford, 2006.
 Incastellamento.
 Hariulf. Gesta ecclesiae Centulensis.
 Painter, Sidney. A History of the Middle Ages 284-1500. New York, 1953.
 Loud, G. A. The American Historical Review, Vol. 98, No. 2. (Apr., 1993), pp 480–481.
 Kreutz, Barbara M. Before the Normans: Southern Italy in the Ninth and Tenth Centuries. Philadelphia: University of Pennsylvania Press, 1991.
 Pierre Toubert: Les structures du Latium médiéval. Le Latium méridional et la Sabine du 9e siècle à la fin du 12e siècle, Rom 1973.

Castles
Medieval architecture